The 33rd Annual GMA Dove Awards were held on April 25, 2002 recognizing accomplishments of musicians for the year 2001. The show was held at the Grand Ole Opry House in Nashville, Tennessee, and was hosted by Yolanda Adams and Kurt Warner.

The awards were broadcast live on the i Network, the first live national broadcast since 1998.

Award recipients
Song of the Year
 "I Can Only Imagine" - Bart Millard; Simpleville Music (ASCAP)
Songwriter of the Year
 Bart Millard
Male Vocalist of the Year
 Mac Powell
Female Vocalist of the Year
 Nicole C. Mullen
Group of the Year
 Third Day
Artist of the Year
 Michael W. Smith
New Artist of the Year
 ZOEgirl
Producer of the Year
 Toby McKeehan
Rap/Hip Hop/Dance Recorded Song of the Year
 "Somebody's Watching Me"; Toby Mac; Toby McKeehan, Michael-Anthony Taylor, Rockwell
Modern Rock/Alternative Recorded Song of the Year
 "Invade My Soul"; By The Tree; Chuck Dennie
Hard Music Recorded Song of the Year
 "Live For Him"; Pillar; Rob Beckley, Travis Jenkins, Brad Noone, Michael Wittig
Rock Recorded Song of the Year
 "Come Together"; Third Day; Tai Anderson, Brad Avery, David Carr, Mark Lee, Mac Powell
Pop/Contemporary Recorded Song of the Year
 "I Can Only Imagine" - MercyMe; Bart Millard
Inspirational Recorded Song of the Year
 "Above All"; Michael W. Smith; Lenny LeBlanc, Paul Baloche
Southern Gospel Recorded Song of the Year
 "He's Watching Me"; Gaither Vocal Band; Tina Sadler
Bluegrass Recorded Song of the Year
 "Thank You, Lord, For Your Blessings On Me"; Easter Brothers; Russell Easter, James Easter, Edd Easter
Country Recorded Song of the Year
 "Goin' Away Party"; Jeff & Sheri Easter; Bruce Haynes
Urban Recorded Song of the Year
 "Thank You"; Kirk Franklin, Mary Mary; Kirk Franklin
Traditional Gospel Recorded Song of the Year
 "Hold On"; Selah; Jesse Dixon
Contemporary Gospel Recorded Song of the Year
 "Anybody Wanna Pray?"; CeCe Winans; Cedric Caldwell, Victor Caldwell, Margaret Bell, Tommy Sims
Rap/Hip Hop/Dance Album of the Year
 "Momentum"; Toby Mac; Toby Mac, Michael-Anthony Taylor, Pete Stewart, Jeff Savage, Randy Crawford, Todd Collins
Modern Rock/Alternative Album of the Year
 "Invade My Soul"; By The Tree; Steve Hindalong, Bob Wohler
Hard Music Album of the Year
 "The Light In Guinevere's Garden"; East West; Bob Burch
Rock Album of the Year
 Come Together; Third Day; Monroe Jones
Pop/Contemporary Album of the Year
 Declaration; Steven Curtis Chapman; Brown Bannister, Steven Curtis Chapman
Inspirational Album of the Year
 Press On; Selah; Jason Kyle, Todd Smith, Allan Hall, Nicol Smith
Southern Gospel Album of the Year
 Encore; Old Friends Quartet; Bill Gaither, Wesley Pritchard, Ben Speer
Country Album of the Year
 From The Heart; The Oak Ridge Boys; Michael Sykes, Duane Allen
Urban Album of the Year
 Just Remember Christmas; Fred Hammond; Fred Hammond
Traditional Gospel Album of the Year
 Hymns; Shirley Caesar; Bubba Smith, Shirley Caesar, Michael Mathis
Contemporary Gospel Album of the Year
 CeCe Winans; CeCe Winans; Brown Bannister, Robbie Buchanon, Tommy Sims
Instrumental Album of the Year
 Freedom; Michael W. Smith; Michael W. Smith, Bryan Lenox
Praise & Worship Album of the Year
 Worship; Michael W. Smith; Michael W. Smith, Tom Laune
Children's Music Album of the Year
 Bedtime Prayers: Lullabies and Peaceful Worship; Twila Paris; John Hartley, Derald Daugherty
Spanish Language Album of the Year
 Mi Corazón; Jaci Velasquez; Emilio Estefan, Jr., Rudy Perez, Mark Heimermann, Alberto Gaitin, Ricardo Gaitin, Alejandro Jean, Freddy Pinero, Jr., Lewis Martineé, Jose Miguel Velasquez
Special Event Album of the Year
 Prayer of Jabez; Sarah Sadler, Margaret Becker, Geoff Moore, Steve Reischl, Erin O'Donnell, Adrienne Liesching, Jamie Rowe, Phil Keaggy, Rebecca St. James, Michael Tait, Jill Phillips, Kevin Max; John Hartley, David Zaffiro
Musical of the Year
 He Chose The Nails; Bryan Lenox, Glenn Wagner
Youth/Children's Musical of the Year
 The Noise We Make; Karla Worley, Robert Sterling
Choral Collection of the Year
 God of Wonders; Steven V. Taylor, Johnathan Crumpton
Recorded Music Packaging of the Year
 Freedom; Michael W. Smith; Tim Parker; Tim Parker; Andrew Southam, Jimmy Abegg
Short Form Music Video of the Year
 "Call On Jesus"; Nicole C. Mullen; Randy Brewer; Jeffrey Phillips
Long Form Music Video of the Year
 Third Day Live In Concert - The Offerings Experience; Third Day; Michael Sacci, Ken Conrad; Carl Diebold; CT Ventures

References 

2002 music awards
GMA Dove Awards
2002 in American music
2002 in Tennessee
GMA